Hans Berr was a German First World War fighter ace credited with 10 victories. Flying a fighter plane, the Fokker Eindecker, Berr was one of the pilots known as the Fokker Scourge. He was one of the first German Jagdstaffel commanders, leading Jagdstaffel 5.

References 
 Above the Lines: The Aces and Fighter Units of the German Air Service, Naval Air Service and Flanders Marine Corps, 1914–1918, p. 71

Aerial victories of Berr, Hans
Berr, Hans